Silas G. Christofferson (1890 – October 31, 1916) was an American aviator.  He was the brother of Harry Christofferson, a fellow Early Bird, and the husband of aviator and X-ray technician Edna Christofferson.

Christofferson was born in Polk County, Iowa in 1890.  When he was six, his family moved to California.  He had six brothers, four of whom also became aviators.  The most notable of these was Harry Christofferson.

By 1908, Christofferson had moved to Los Angeles, California, where he worked as a chauffeur.

In 1910, Christofferson co-founded the Bennett-Christofferson Airship Company in Portland, Oregon.  Also named on the incorporation papers were Fred and Mabel Bennett.  The company started out with a capital stock of 3000 dollars.  By 1911, Christofferson and Fred Bennett were making practice flights on the artillery drill grounds of the Vancouver Barracks.  They were only permitted to fly in the early morning and after 4 PM to avoid spooking the mules at the barracks.  On at least one of these flights, Christofferson took a passenger, Edna Becker.  Becker and Christofferson married on November 19, 1912.

In 1912, Christofferson flew eight miles from the roof of the 150-foot-tall Multnomah Building in Portland, Oregon to the Vancouver Barracks in Vancouver, Washington.  The flight took him twelve minutes and was observed by a crowd of over 45,000.  Upon landing, he said that "[w]hile my trip was not as pleasant as some might think, I enjoyed it immensely."  The Oregonian declared it a record-setting feat, claiming Christofferson was the first to "[trust] his heavier-than-air machine in a start from the midst of a business section of a great city."

In 1914, Christofferson reached an altitude of 15,728 feet in a flight over Mount Whitney, setting a national record.  It was his second attempt of the day to fly over the mountain: his first attempt, at 5:21 AM that morning, was unsuccessful due to strong winds.

On October 31, 1916, Christofferson was testing a new biplane prototype to demonstrate its safety.  Two hundred feet above the ground, his engine died.  He was rushed to the Redwood City Hospital by Edna and Harry.  A few hours after the crash, Christofferson died of internal injuries.  He was buried beside Lincoln Beachey in Cypress Lawn Cemetery.

See also
EAA Aviation Museum
Walter Edward Kittel (1880–1922) early American aviation pioneer

References

1890 births
1916 deaths
Accidental deaths in California
Aviators from Iowa
Aviators killed in aviation accidents or incidents in the United States
Members of the Early Birds of Aviation
People from Des Moines, Iowa
Victims of aviation accidents or incidents in 1916